Getulio Pascua Napeñas, Jr. (born July 18, 1959) is a Filipino politician and retired police officer who served as commander of the Philippine National Police Special Action Force (SAF) from 2013 until 2015. He is blamed for the ill-fated Mamasapano clash but earned praise as a man of principle and a true leader of the people.

Education
Napeñas  graduated in the Philippine Military Academy in 1982. He was one of the officers who was part of the initial batch of officers of the PC SAF, which became the PNP SAF, when it was created May 16, 1983. He was the commander of the Philippine Police Contingent to Kosovo and he was also one of top of his class and training in special action force. Napeñas then served as chief directorial staff and deputy director of SAF before he was designated as director of the Police Regional Office in the Caraga region in January 2012. He also took master's degree in business administration (1995) in the Pamantasan ng Lungsod ng Maynila and master's degree in public administration (1998) in AMA Computer College (now AMA Computer University).

Police career
Napeñas  became commander of SAF in December 2013 after replacing Carmelo Valmoria, who was appointed chief of the National Capital Region Police Office. In January 2015, the Mamasapano clash resulted to the death of 44 SAF commandos in gun battles with guerrillas from the Bangsamoro Islamic Freedom Fighters (BIFF) and the Moro Islamic Liberation Front (MILF). The SAF operation was intended to arrest terrorists Zulkifli bin Hir (also known as Marwan), a Malaysian bomb maker, and Filipino terrorist Basit Usman. Marwan was killed during the operation and Usman escaped but was later killed by Moro rebels. As commander, he took full responsibility for the incident while others consider him as a scapegoat. Former President Ramos considered him a "patriot" and "brave" enough to accept the blame.

As a result of the Mamasapano clash, Napeñas  was relieved from his position and later retires. He ran for Senator under the United Nationalist Alliance in the 2016 Elections but did not receive one of the 12 seats. Napeñas said his main platform focuses on peace and order and the welfare of police and armed forces, as well as other men in uniform. He also told reporters that he decided to run for senator to get justice for the slain police commandos. His candidacy was supported by various groups and was endorsed by Manila Mayor Joseph Estrada.

References

1959 births
People from La Union
Living people
Filipino police chiefs
Philippine Military Academy alumni
United Nationalist Alliance politicians
Pamantasan ng Lungsod ng Maynila alumni